The Florence-Muscle Shoals Metropolitan Area,  commonly known as The Shoals, is a metropolitan statistical area in northwestern Alabama including the cities of Florence, Muscle Shoals, Tuscumbia, and Sheffield, and the counties of Lauderdale and Colbert. The 2020 Census population for the Shoals is 148,779 and an additional 410,000 commute to the Shoals daily as the economic, social, and educational center of northwest Alabama. The Shoals has also been known as the Tri-Cities and the Quad-Cities by locals.

The area is home to the University of North Alabama, located in Florence, and the birthplace of Helen Keller (Tuscumbia) and W.C. Handy (Florence). It is also home to a community college, Northwest Shoals Community College located in Muscle Shoals.  Every summer the play "The Miracle Worker" is produced for the public to view on the original Keller homesite. The water pump at which Helen rediscovered language is used as a prop in the play. Other area attractions include the Wilson Dam, the Shoals Theater located in downtown Florence, and a Robert Trent Jones golf course.

The Shoals is also noted for its rich music traditions and is sometimes referred to as the birthplace of the Blues because W.C. Handy is credited by many as the father of the Blues. Since the 1970s, 80s, and to some extent even today, The Shoals has been home to a thriving recording industry, particularly based on the sensational output of FAME Studios and Muscle Shoals Sound Studio.  In the FAME Studios, Dan Penn, Spooner Oldham, Chips Moman, and Rick Hall made soul music including the hit song by Percy Sledge,  "When a Man Loves a Woman". Rock groups and musicians including The Rolling Stones, Aretha Franklin, Julian Lennon, Bob Seger,  Bob Dylan, Paul Simon, Cher, The Osmonds, Paul Anka, Etta James, Jimmy Cliff, The Staple Singers, Wilson Pickett, and Lynyrd Skynyrd have recorded there.

During late July and early August, the area hosts the famed Handy Music and Helen Keller Festivals.

Noted attorney, actor, former senator and presidential contender Fred Thompson was born in Sheffield, as was U.S. Senator Mitch McConnell.

 
Metropolitan areas of Alabama